Ewald Gerhard Seeliger (1877-1959) was a German novelist. Seeliger was a prolific writer who wrote novels mainly set at sea or around Hamburg. He is known for his 1910 novel England's Fiend about a German inventor who takes on the Royal Navy in a new airship, and his 1913 comedy crime story Peter Voss, Thief of Millions which has been adapted into many films. He is sometimes known as E.G. Seeliger.

References

Bibliography
Bridgham, Frederick George Thomas. The First World War as a Clash of Cultures. Boydell & Brewer, 2006.

1877 births
1959 deaths
20th-century German novelists
German male novelists
20th-century German male writers